Russa may refer to:
 Staraya Russa, a town in Novgorod Oblast, Russia
 Robert Russa Moton (1867–1940), African-American educator and author
 Márcia Matos Calaça (born 1963), commonly known as Russa, Brazilian footballer

See also 

 La Russa
 Russia (disambiguation)